Paralecta electrophanes is a moth in the family Xyloryctidae. It was described by Edward Meyrick in 1930. It is found in Malaysia.

References

Paralecta
Taxa named by Edward Meyrick
Moths described in 1930